Flare path may refer to:

an illuminated runway in military terminology
Flare Path (play), a play by Terence Rattigan set near an RAF base